451 Group is a New York City-based technology industry research firm. Through its Uptime Institute operating unit, the company provides research for data center operators. In December 2019, 451 Group sold an operating division, 451 Research, to information and analytics company S&P Global.

History
451 Group acquired Uptime Institute in 2009. The company subsequently acquired:

 consumer spending research firm ChangeWave Research in 2011 
 events company Tech Touchstone in 2013 
 mobile communications research firm Yankee Group in 2013
 IT professional community Wisegate in 2017.

The company's 451 Research division was acquired by S&P Global Market Intelligence on December 6, 2019, according to a company press release.

Business

Uptime Institute is the operating division of the 451 Group. It is an American professional services organization best known for its "Tier Standard". and the associated certification of data center compliance with the standard.

Founded in 1987 by Kenneth G. Brill, the Uptime Institute was founded as an industry proponent to help owners and operators quantify and qualify their ability to provide a predictable level of performance from data centers, regardless of the status of external factors, such as power utilities.

451 Research
451 Research was formerly part of 451 Group.  Until being acquired by S&P Global in December 2019, it was an information technology industry analyst firm, headquartered in New York with offices in London, Boston, Washington DC, and San Francisco.

The company claimed over 250 employees, over 100 industry analysts and over 1000 clients. The company produced qualitative and quantitative research, across thirteen research channels, and targets service providers, technology vendors, enterprise IT leaders and financial professionals.

See also
 High availability
 Downtime
 Uptime

References

External links 

 

Information technology companies of the United States
Consulting firms established in 1993
International information technology consulting firms
Research and analysis firms of the United States
Reliability engineering